Matakana is a former New Zealand parliamentary electorate in the Thames-Coromandel District, which existed for one parliamentary term from 1993 to 1996, and was held by Graeme Lee. In 1994, Lee defected from the National Party to the Christian Democrat Party.

Population centres
Based on the 1991 New Zealand census, an electoral redistribution was carried out. This resulted in the abolition of nine electorates, and the creation of eleven new electorates. Through an amendment in the Electoral Act in 1965, the number of electorates in the South Island was fixed at 25, so the new electorates increased the number of the North Island electorates by two. In the South Island, one electorate was abolished and one electorate was recreated. In the North Island, five electorates were newly created (including Matakana), five electorates were recreated, and eight electorates were abolished.

The electorate was located adjacent to the Bay of Plenty on the east coast of the North Island, north of Tauranga and south of the Coromandel Peninsula. It is named after Matakana Island. Polling booths where more than 1,000 votes were cast were located in Katikati, Paeroa, Waihi, Waihi Beach, and Whangamatā. In 1996, parts of the Matakana and Hauraki electorates were taken to form the Coromandel electorate.

History
This electorate was formed for the 44th session of the New Zealand Parliament in 1993. It existed for one term until 1996, and was represented by Graeme Lee of the National Party. In 1994, Lee defected to the Christian Democrat Party.

Members of Parliament
Key

Election results

1993 election

Further reading

References

Historical electorates of New Zealand
Thames-Coromandel District
1993 establishments in New Zealand
1996 disestablishments in New Zealand